Verin Kalakut (also, Verkhniy Kalakut), is an abandoned settlement in the Aragatsotn Province of Armenia.

See also 
Aragatsotn Province

References 

Former populated places in Aragatsotn Province
Yazidi populated places in Armenia